Scottish Backhold is a style of folk wrestling originating in Scotland.  The wrestlers grip each other around the waist at the back, with the right hand under the opponent's left arm and the chin resting on the opposite right shoulder.  When the referee is sure that both wrestlers have taken a firm grip, he shouts "hold" and the bout starts.  Should either wrestler break his hold or touch the ground with any part of his body except his feet, he loses.  There is no ground work and the bouts are usually best of five falls.

Since 1985 there has been a Celtic organisation that is trying to combine the Scottish, Breton and Icelandic forms of wrestling. The Scottish Wrestling Bond publishes the rules of Backhold.

There are many clubs around Scotland that coach and practice the sport of Backhold wrestling with popular clubs from Edinburgh, Carnoustie, Glasgow and Hamilton. There are many Highland games through the summer months which attract athletes to come and compete from all over the world. Countries such as France, Iceland, America, England and many more represent their countries annually in their hopes to win a prestigious title.

References

See also
 Cumberland and Westmorland wrestling
 Dirk Dance
 Historical fencing in Scotland
 Irish wrestling

Folk wrestling styles
Wrestling in Scotland
Sport in Scotland
Sports originating in Scotland
European martial arts